The Metallurgical Laboratory (also known as "Metallurgical Lab"), is an accredited multi-program national testing institute, established in 1972 to take participation in developing physio-metallurgical aspects of the clandestine atomic bomb projects.  It is located in the vicinity of Wah Military District and jointly runs its research program in conjuncture with Pakistan Ordnance Factory (POF) and the University of Punjab.

The Metallurgical Lab was established by its chief physical chemist Khalil Qureshi of the Pakistan Atomic Energy Commission (PAEC) to study the effects and containment of nuclear fission for the civil purposes. Throughout the 1970s, the academic programs at Metallurgical Lab was purely directed by the armed forces engineers and scientists dispatched at the Pakistan Ordnance Factory for defence and security purposes. As of current, the Metallurgical Lab is currently working on civilian programs and is under the control of Pakistan National Accreditation Council of the Ministry of Science and Technology of Government of Pakistan.

References

Science and technology in Pakistan
University of the Punjab
Nuclear weapons programme of Pakistan
Military research of Pakistan
Science parks in Pakistan
Research institutes in Pakistan
Laboratories in Pakistan